Fábio de Jesus or simply Fabinho (born October 16, 1976, in Nova Iguaçu), is a Brazilian defensive midfielder.

Club statistics

Honours
 Santos
Brazilian League Série A: 2004
 Internacional
Copa Libertadores: 2006
FIFA Club World Championship: 2006
 Fluminense
Brazilian Cup: 2007

References

External links
 zerozero.pt
 Guardian Stats Centre
 globoesporte
 fluminense.com

External links

1976 births
Living people
Brazilian footballers
Brazilian expatriate footballers
Campeonato Brasileiro Série A players
J1 League players
Sport Club Internacional players
Bonsucesso Futebol Clube players
Associação Atlética Ponte Preta players
Gamba Osaka players
CR Flamengo footballers
Shimizu S-Pulse players
Expatriate footballers in Japan
Santos FC players
Fluminense FC players
People from Nova Iguaçu
Association football midfielders
Sportspeople from Rio de Janeiro (state)